Patrick Galbraith and Rick Leach were the defending champions but they competed with different partners that year, Galbraith with Alex O'Brien and Leach with Jonas Björkman.

Galbraith and O'Brien lost in the quarterfinals to Trevor Kronemann and David Macpherson.

Björkman and Leach lost in the final 6–3, 6–3 against Luis Lobo and Javier Sánchez.

Seeds

  Byron Black /  Grant Connell (semifinals)
  Patrick Galbraith /  Alex O'Brien (quarterfinals)
  Jonas Björkman /  Rick Leach (final)
  Luis Lobo /  Javier Sánchez (champions)

Draw

External links
 Doubles draw

Tennis Channel Open
1997 ATP Tour
1997 Tennis Channel Open